The Majangidae are a revived (2019) family of praying mantids from Madagascar. 

As part of a major revision of mantid taxonomy, this family consists of genera in two subfamilies previously placed in the Liturgusidae (Majanginae) and Deroplatyinae.  The new placement means that this taxon is part of the superfamily Epaphroditoidea (of the clade Cernomantodea) and infraorder Schizomantodea.

Subfamilies and Genera
The Mantodea Species File lists two subfamilies:
Brancsikiinae
 Brancsikia Saussure & Zehntner, 1895: 2 spp.
Majanginae
 tribe Danuriellini
 Danuriella Westwood, 1889: 3 spp.
 tribe Majangini
 Liturgusella Giglio-Tos, 1915 
 monotypic L. malagassa Saussure & Zehntner, 1895
 Majanga Wood-Mason, 1891: 3 spp.
 Majanga basilaris Westwood, 1889 - type species

References

External links 

Mantodea families
Mantodea of Africa
Mantodea